Eumera is a genus of moths in the family Geometridae described by Staudinger in 1892.

Species
 Eumera hoeferi Wehrli, 1934
 Eumera regina Staudinger, 1892

References

Colotoini